U.S.S.R. Life from the Other Side is a 1999 studio album by DJ Vadim, released on Ninja Tune.

Critical reception
John Bush of AllMusic gave the album 4.5 stars out of 5, saying, "Since he's working with rappers on more than half of the tracks here, Vadim transforms himself from a solo turntablist into a genuine rap trackmaster with catchier riffs and tighter beats than most in Britain's instrumental hip-hop underground." Ron Hart of CMJ New Music Report said, "Vadim has established himself as one of the most creative beatminers on the European circuit."

Track listing

References

External links
 

1999 albums
DJ Vadim albums
Ninja Tune albums